People's Power (Spanish and Portuguese: Poder Popular) is a common political rallying cry used in party names and slogans.

Instances of its use include:

Lok Shakti, a political party in India
National Assembly of People's Power of Cuba, the Parliament of Cuba
People's Power (Angola), a political faction within the Communist MPLA in the 1970s
People's Power (Colombia), a political party in Colombia
Lakas ng Bayan ("People's Power"), a political party in the Philippines

Political catchphrases